Frederick Charles Ball (1 September 1868 – 4 September 1902) was an Australian rules footballer who played with Essendon in the Victorian Football League (VFL).

He later moved to London and in September 1902 was found dead in his home in Islington with stab wounds. An inquest determined that he had committed suicide.

Notes

External links
		

1868 births
1902 suicides
Australian rules footballers from Victoria (Australia)
Australian expatriate sportspeople in England
Essendon Football Club players
Suicides by sharp instrument in England
Suicides in Islington
1902 deaths